

Television

2020s

2010s

2000s

1990s

1980s

1970s

1960s

1950s

Substitutes

Play-by-Play
Mike Crispino (1988–89)
Mike Lynch (1988–94)
Bob Lobel (1989–93)
Gary Tanguay (2007–Present)

Color commentator
John Havlicek (1983–89)
Hank Finkel (1983–93)
Rick Weitzman (1983–90)
Dave Gavitt (1983–89)
Upton Bell (1983–88)
Jimmy Myers (1983–90)
Bob Ryan (1983–89)
M.L. Carr (1985–89)
Dave Cowens (1985–89)
Ronnie Perry Jr. (1988–90)
Cedric Maxwell (2007–present)
Bill Raftery (2009–10)

Courtside Reporter
Willie Maye (2008–Present)

Studio Host
Paul Devlin (1998–99)
Mike Felger (2007–Present)

Studio Analyst
Tim Welsh (2008–09)

Notes
From 1975-1995, select Celtics games were shown in the Hartford area on WATR-TV (1975-1982), WTXX (1982-1995), and WTIC-TV (1987-1995).

Radio

2020s

2010s

2000s

1990s

1980s

1970s

1960s

1950s

Substitutes

Play by Play 
Bob Lobel (1976-1978)
Gil Santos (1979-1980)
Glenn Ordway (1981-1989)
Sean McDonough (1997-2001)
Ted Sarandis (1997-2001)
Jeff Twiss (1998–99)
Dave Jageler (2001-2002)
Dale Arnold (2010-2011)

Color commentator 
Jimmy Myers (2002-2003)

See also 
 List of current National Basketball Association broadcasters
 List of Boston Red Sox broadcasters
 List of Boston Bruins broadcasters
 List of New England Revolution broadcasters
 List of New England Patriots broadcasters

Notes
From 1999-2008, Bob Cousy appeared as a part-time analyst on Celtics games, calling about 10 games each season.
During the 1980 NBA Playoffs, Johnny Most split play-by-play duties with Gil Santos due to problems with Most's voice. Most called the first and fourth quarters and served as an analyst during the second and third, while Santos called the second and third and analyzed the other two.

References 

SportsChannel
Fox Sports Networks
NBC Sports Regional Networks
Boston Celtics
 
Broadcasters